The 2013 Dutch Championships were held in Rotterdam. It was a smaller competition than usual, as it was held after the 2012 Summer Olympics.

Most memorably, Eythora Thorsdottir, who is now a European medallist, won every event but the floor exercise in the Junior competition.

Artistic Gymnastics Dutch Championships